A bridge piercing is a facial piercing through the skin on the bridge of the nose, usually directly between the eyes of the wearer. A variation on this piercing, the vertical bridge piercing is a surface piercing, with all of the risks or potential complications related to surface piercings.

The risk of rejection is quite high for this piercing, as it is a surface piercing. There is also a high risk of scarring when the jewellery is removed.

Besides decorative jewelry, bridge piercings can hold spectacles.

Jewellery
Bridge piercings are most commonly pierced with straight barbells, although curved barbells and surface bars are also possible initial jewellery.  Once the piercing is healed, it is possible to wear a captive bead ring in it, although depending on the placement of the piercing, a D-ring styled ring may be necessary to prevent migration caused by the pressure exerted by the shape of a ring.

Like many other facial piercings, there are many misconceptions about bridge piercings. Some involve eye problems, such as involuntary eye crossing. Other beliefs have to do with infections from piercings spreading to the brain, via the sinuses.

References

External links

 Body Modification E-Zine Encyclopedia entry on bridge piercings 
 Body Modification E-Zine Encyclopedia entry on Erl van Aken

Facial piercings
Surface piercings